Jalal al-Din Mohammad ibn Abdollah Yazdi, also known as Jalal al-Din Monajjem Yazdi (died 1618), was a Safavid astrologer (monajjem) and chronicler of Persian origin. His chronicle, the Roozname-ye Molla Jallal (also referred to as Tarikh-e Abbasi), covers Safavid history from 1576 to 1611. It deals with a period spanning from the final year of the reign of Shah ("King") Tahmasp I (1524–1576) to the penultimate decade of the reign of Shah Abbas the Great (also known as Abbas I; 1588–1629). Born at an unknown date, Yazdi's family originated from the city of Yazd. He wrote two other works in addition to the Roozname-ye Molla Jalal; the Tohfat al-monajjemin ("Gift for astrologers") and the Tohfeh-ye khani ("Gift for the Khan"). Two of Yazdi's son are known to have survived his death. One of his sons, Kamal, became court astrologer in the final years of the reign of Abbas I and continued to occupy this post until the reign of Shah Abbas II (1642–1666).

Sources
 
 

Year of birth unknown
1618 deaths
16th-century writers of Safavid Iran
17th-century writers of Safavid Iran
16th-century Iranian historians
17th-century Iranian historians
People from Yazd
Iranian astrologers
Safavid historians
16th-century astrologers
17th-century astrologers